Loss Creek (also known as Lost Creek) rises south of Coleman in central Coleman County, Texas, United States (at 31°50' N, 99°26' W) and flows southeast for  to its mouth on Home Creek (at 31°42' N, 99°24' W). The stream passes through rolling terrain where clay and sandy loams support grasses, mesquite, and cacti.

See also
List of rivers of Texas

References

Rivers of Texas
Rivers of Coleman County, Texas